Baltimore Avenue–College Park–UMD is a light rail station that is currently under construction. It will be part of the Purple Line in Maryland. The station will be located at the intersection of Baltimore Avenue and Rossborough Lane on the eastern campus of the University of Maryland.

History 
The Purple Line system is under construction as of 2022 and is scheduled to open in 2026.

Station layout
The station consists of two side platforms on either side of Rossborough Lane.

References

Purple Line (Maryland)
Railway stations scheduled to open in 2026
Transportation in Prince George's County, Maryland
Railway stations in Prince George's County, Maryland
University of Maryland, College Park facilities
Railway stations in Maryland at university and college campuses